The 1923 Philadelphia mayoral election saw the election of W. Freeland Kendrick.

Results

References

1923
Philadelphia
1923 Pennsylvania elections
1920s in Philadelphia